History of the Arabs refers to the history of the Arab people.

It may also refer to:
 History of the Arabs (book) by Philip Khuri Hitti
 A History of the Arab Peoples, book by Albert Hourani
 History of the Arab League
 History of the Palestinians